Tylotiella malva is a species of sea snail, a marine gastropod mollusk in the family Drilliidae.

Description
The length of the shell attains 30 mm.

Distribution
This marine species occurs in the Gulf of Aden and off Somalia.

References

 Morassi, M. (1998a) From Somalia a new species of Tylotiella (Gastropoda: Turridae). Conchiglia, 30(286), 21–22.

External links
 

malva
Gastropods described in 1998